Calosoma is a genus of large ground beetles that occur primarily throughout the Northern Hemisphere, and are referred to as caterpillar hunters or caterpillar searchers. Many of the 167 species are largely or entirely black, but some have bright metallic coloration. They produce a foul-smelling spray from glands near the tip of the abdomen. They are recognizable due to their large thorax, which is almost the size of their abdomen and much wider than their head.

Calosoma has about 20 subgenera, including some former genera such as Callisthenes.

History
In 1905, Calosoma sycophanta was imported to New England for control of the gypsy moth. The species is a voracious consumer of caterpillars during both its larval stage and as an adult, as are other species in the genus. For this reason, they are generally considered beneficial insects. Several species of this beetle, most notably the black calosoma (Calosoma semilaeve) are especially common in the California area.

See also
 List of Calosoma species

References

 Friedrich Weber 1801: Obs. Ent., 20; Fabricius 1801, Syst. Eleuth., 1: 211.
 Ground beetles of the genus Calosoma (Carabidae): atlas of beetles of Russia
 Detailed catalogue of ground beetles of the genus Callisthenes Fischer von Waldheim, 1821
 Powell & Hogue (1979), California Insects. p. 262.

External links
 
 
 Ground Beetles, Susan Mahr,University of Wisconsin-Madison.
 Forest Caterpillar Hunter, BioLib.cz.

Calosoma
Carabidae genera
Insects used as insect pest control agents